Timurid conquests and invasions started in the seventh decade of the 14th century with Timur's control over Chagatai Khanate and ended at the start of the 15th century with the death of Timur. Due to the sheer scale of Timur's wars, and the fact that he was generally undefeated in battle, he has been regarded as one of the most successful military commanders of all time. These wars resulted in the supremacy of Timur over Central Asia, Persia,  the Caucasus and the Levant, and parts of South Asia and Eastern Europe, and also the formation of the short-lived Timurid Empire. Scholars estimate that his military campaigns caused the deaths of 17 million people, amounting to about 5% of the world population at the time.

Timur gained power over the Western Chagatai Khanate (Transoxiana) after defeating Amir Husayn, the regent of the Chagatai Khanate, at the Battle of Balkh but the laws laid down by Genghis Khan prevented him from becoming Khagan in his own right because he was not directly descendant of Genghis Khan by birth. Instead, he installed a puppet Khan descended from Ögedei, Suurgatmish. After that, he launched massive military campaigns in all directions and established his suzerainty over most of Middle East and Central Asia. He never adopted the title of Emperor or Caliph, maintaining the title of Amir.

To legitimize his rule and military campaigns Timur married Husayn's widow Saray Mulk Khanum, a princess descended from Genghis Khan. In this way he called himself Temur Gurgan (son-in-law of the Great Khan, Genghis Khan). Timurid territorial gains in Transoxiana and Central Asia as well as Timur's suzerainty over the Mamluk Sultanate, the Ottoman Empire, the Delhi Sultanate and the Golden Horde were weakened after his death, due to a war of succession between his son and grandson Shahrukh Mirza and Khalil Sultan . However, in the Indian subcontinent a Timurid state survived until the mid 19th century in the form of the Mughal Empire which was founded by his great-great-grandson Babur.

Central Asia
Timur became head of the Barlas tribe (a Central Asian tribe) and its vast lands by helping Amir Husayn, a Qara'unas prince and de facto ruler of Western Chagatai Khanate. Timur's period as a Moghul vassal came to an end when Tughlugh Timur appointed his son Ilyas Khoja as governor of Mawarannahr. Both Timur and Amir Husayn rebelled against Ilyas Khoja but were defeated by Khoja's army at Tashkent. Ilyas Khoja advanced towards Samarkand but here he was defeated by Timurid forces and forced to retreat back into Eastern Chagatai Khanate. In this way, Timur became ruler of Samarkand.

South Asia

In 1370 Timur decided to attack Amir Husayn at Balkh. After crossing the Amu Darya at Termez his army surrounded the city. Husayn's army came out of the city to attack Timur's men, perhaps suggesting that they were unhappy to find themselves being besieged. The same occurred on the second day of the battle, but this time Timur's men managed to get into the city. Husayn shut himself up inside the citadel, leaving Timur's men to sack the city.

After capturing the city, Timur executed Khabul Shah, the Husayn's puppet Khan of Western Chagatai and installed Suurgatmish on the throne of Khan as his puppet. This made Timur the main power in Mawarannahr and Western Chagatai Khanate with supremacy over Central Asia.

After balkh he sent his 250 golden Regiment to take Ghor city, but after few days he got reports of 250 men being killed by ghurid army of Abdal Gulzai.
Then after he prepared his army to take revenge and sent his army toward ghor from Persia he also asked his son to sent 20.000 army toward ghur as reinforcement.
His army reached ghur and launched attack on ghuristan the resistance was very high he lost his many men and timur was injured and retreated but come back with new strategy to defeat Abdal Gulzai using 
Cannons against ghurid army finally he got succeeded to take ghor and Abdal gulzai joined his army and helped him in conquests of India.

In 1398, Timur started his campaign towards Indian subcontinent (Hindustan). At that time the dominant power of subcontinent was Tughlaq dynasty of Delhi Sultanate but it had already been weakened by the formation of regional sultanates and struggle of succession within imperial family. Timur started his journey from Samarkand. He invaded the north Indian subcontinent (present day Pakistan and North India) by crossing the Indus River on September 30, 1398.

Timurid forces firstly sacked Tulamba and then Multan by October 1398. Prior to Timur's invasion on Delhi, his grandson Pir Muhammad had already started his expedition. He had captured Uch. Pir Muhammad then joined Timur. The Bhati Rajput governor of the Bhatner fort was defeated, and Timur destroyed the fort and the city. He also faced resistance by Governor of Meerut but he was still able to approach Delhi, arrived in 1398. In this way, he already defeated all-important administrative centres of Delhi Sultanate before his arrival to Delhi.

The battle between Sultan Nasir-ud-Din Tughlaq allied with Mallu Iqbal and Timur took place on 17 December 1398. Indian forces had war elephants armored with chain mail and poison on their tusks which gave difficult time to Timurid forces as Tatars experienced this first time. But within a passage of time Timur had understood that elephants were easily panicked. He capitalized on the subsequent disruption in the forces of Nasir-ud-Din Tughluq, securing an easy victory. Sultan of Delhi fled with remnants of his forces. Delhi was sacked and left in ruins. After the battle, Timur installed Khizr Khan, the Governor of Multan as the new Sultan of Delhi Sultanate under his suzerainty.

Delhi's conquest was one of the greatest victories of Timur, arguably surpassing Darius the Great, Alexander the Great and Genghis Khan because of the harsh conditions of the journey and the achievement of taking down the richest city of the world at the time. Delhi suffered a great loss due to this and took a century to recover.

In 1505, Babur's Timurid army marched to raid Bangash district. When they reached a valley between Kohat and Hangu, they beheaded about 100 to 200 Bangash Pashtuns and set up a pillar of their heads. On the next day, Babur reached Hangu and set up another tower of heads. Afterwards, the Timurids marched to Bannu on the Kurram River, where they set up their third pillar of heads. In 1507, one year after the Battle of Qalati Ghilji, Babur's army marched out of Kabul with the intention to crush Ghilji Pashtuns. They attacked Ghilji Pashtuns in the mountains of Khwaja Ismail near Katawaz, setting up another pillar of heads.

On 6 January 1519, Babur captured the Fort of Bajaur and then massacred at least 3,000 Bajauri Pashtuns, setting up a tower of their skulls. On 30 January 1519, Babur married Bibi Mubarika, daughter of a Pashtun chief Shah Mansur Yusufzai, as part of a peace treaty with Yusufzai Pashtuns. Mubarika played an important role in the establishment of friendly relations of Yusufzai Pashtun chiefs with Babur, who later founded the Mughal Empire after defeating Pashtun Sultan Ibrahim Lodi at the Battle of Panipat in 1526.

Western Asia

Caucasus

Kingdom of Georgia, a Christian kingdom dominated on the most of Caucasus, was subjected many times by Timur between 1386 and 1403. These conflicts were intimately linked with the wars between Timur and Tokhtamysh, the last Khan of Golden Horde. He officially proclaimed his invasions to be jihad against non-Muslims. Although Timur invaded the Georgia many times but he never made attempt to make Georgia a Muslim country. Timur personally led most of these raids to subdue the recalcitrant Georgian monarch. Kingdom of Georgia suffered a great loss due to these invasions and never recovered again. By the time George VII was forced to accept Timur's terms of peace and agree to pay tribute, he was a master of little more than gutted towns, ravaged countryside and a shattered monarchy.

Timur's first appearance in the Caucasus was a response to Tokhtamysh’s marauding inroad into Northern Iran through the Caucasian lands in 1385. After having overrun Azerbaijan and Kars, Timur marched into Georgia. Firstly he assailed Samtskhe atabegate, the principality of Kingdom of Georgia. From there, he marched against Tbilisi which the Georgian king Bagrat V had fortified. The city fell on November 21, 1386, and King Bagrat V was captured. However Bagrat V was given some 12,000 troops to reestablish himself in Georgia under Timur's suzerainty.

In the following years Timur invaded Georgia many times and remained victorious in most of conflicts. In spring of 1387, he returned to Georgia to take revenge for the ambush and escape. In 1394, he again captured eastern provinces which were taken by Georgians during Tokhtamysh–Timur wars.

In 1395 the desperate Georgians allied themselves with Sidi Ali of Shekki and captured the Jalayirid prince, Tahir. This event prompted Timur to return, later in 1399. He took Shekki and devastated the neighboring region of Kakheti. In the spring of 1400, Timur moved back to destroy the Georgian state once and for all. He demanded that George VII should hand over the Jalayirid Tahir but George VII refused and met Timur at the Sagim River in Lower Kartli, but suffered a defeat. After the war, of those who survived the fighting and reprisals, many thousands died of hunger and disease, and 60,000 survivors were enslaved and carried away by Timur's troops.

In late 1401, Timur invaded the Caucasus once again. George VII had to sue for peace, and sent his brother with the contributions. Timur made peace with George VII on condition that the King of Georgia supplied him troops during his campaign against Ottoman Empire and granted the Muslims special privileges. Once the Ottomans were defeated, Timur, back to Erzurum in 1402, decided to punish the king of Georgia for not having come to present his congratulations on his victory. Historians reported that 700 towns were destroyed and their inhabitants massacred by Timurid forces.

George VII had to pay a huge tribute in the name of Timur. After the tribute, Timur made peace with George VII and then finally he left Caucasus permanently. All the territories from Beylagan to Trebizond were officially given by Timur as an appanage to his grandson Khalil Sultan.

Eastern Europe

Golden Horde was a division of Mongol Empire which was mainly dominated on the Eastern Europe. After the death of Jochi, the eldest son of Genghis Khan and emperor of Golden Horde, the Golden Horde itself divided into many wings with mainly White and Blue wings among Jochi's descendants. In the late 1370s and early 1380s, Timur firstly helped Tokhtamysh against his uncle Urus Khan to assume supreme power in the White wing and then in the unification of Golden Horde. Timur also supported him to attack Grand Duchy of Moscow in 1382 and get tribute from the Muscovy.

After being established, Tokhtamysh invaded Azerbaijan and Northwest Iran in 1385 when Timur was busy in his conquest of Persia. Tokhtamysh plundered Tabriz and could retire a rich booty. The inevitable response by Timur resulted in the major-scale war between them. The initial battle was fought between them at Volga River in 1391 which became victorious for Timur and allowed Tokhtamysh with his remaining army to escape. Despite the defeat, Tokhtamysh recovered his position and in the spring of 1395 raided the Timurid territory of Shirvan.

At that time Timur then counter-attacked by not only reconquering his own territories but also the realm of enemy via the crossing Caucasus region. In 1395, Timur defeated Tokhtamysh in the Battle of the Terek River and concluding the struggle between them. In the same year, Timur also plundered Sarai, the capital of Golden Horde and other important cities including Ukek, Majar, Azaq and Astrakhan. After the battle of Terek River, Tokhtamysh was deposed and fleeing to the Ukrainian steppes where he asking for help from Grand Duke Vytautas of Lithuania but he never restored again.

Timur installed Edigu on the throne under his suzerainty in place of Tokhtamysh, Golden Horde became tributary of Timur and the boundaries of Timurid Empire were secured. The Golden Horde never recovered again from this and in the middle of the 15th century, it fragmented into smaller khanates: the Kazan Khanate, Nogai Horde, Qasim Khanate, Crimean Khanate and Astrakhan Khanate. This led the decline of Tatar-Mongol rule over Russian lands and thus in 1480, Grand duchy of Moscow became free to pay tribute to Tatar-Mongols.

Gallery

References

Further reading

Beatrice Forbes Manz, "Temür and the Problem of a Conqueror's Legacy," Journal of the Royal Asiatic Society, Third Series, Vol. 8, No. 1 (Apr., 1998)
Abazov, Rafis. "Timur (Tamerlane) and the Timurid Empire in Central Asia." The Palgrave Concise Historical Atlas of Central Asia. Palgrave Macmillan US, 2008. 56–57.
YÜKSEL, Musa Şamil. "Timur’un Yükselişi ve Batı’nın Diplomatik Cevabı, 1390–1405." Selçuk Üniversitesi Türkiyat Araştırmaları Dergisi 1.18 (2005): 231–243.
Shterenshis, Michael V. "Approach to Tamerlane: Tradition and Innovation." Central Asia and the Caucasus 2 (2000).

Marozzi, Justin, Tamerlane: sword of Islam, conqueror of the world, London: HarperCollins, 2004
Marlowe, Christopher: Tamburlaine the Great. Ed. J. S. Cunningham. Manchester University Press, Manchester 1981.
Novosel'tsev, A. P. "On the Historical Evaluation of Tamerlane." Soviet studies in history 12.3 (1973): 37–70.
Sykes, P. M. "Tamerlane." Journal of the Central Asian Society 2.1 (1915): 17–33.

Marozzi, Justin, "Tamerlane", in: The Art of War: great commanders of the ancient and medieval world, Andrew Roberts (editor), London: Quercus Military History, 2008. 

Battles of Timur
Military history of the Timurid Empire
1370s conflicts
1380s conflicts
1390s conflicts
1400s conflicts
1370s in Asia
1380s in Asia
1390s in Asia
1400s in Asia
1370s in Europe
1380s in Europe
1390s in Europe